Under Armour is an American sports clothing and accessories company. The company is a supplier of sportswear and casual apparel. Under Armour began offering footwear in 2006. Its global headquarters is located in Baltimore, Maryland, US, with additional North American corporate office locations in Austin and Houston, Texas; Denver, Colorado; New York, New York; San Francisco, California; Portland, Oregon; Nashville, Tennessee; and Toronto, Ontario. Under Armour's International Headquarters is located in Panama City, Panama, with Latin America offices in São Paulo, Brazil; Santiago, Chile; and Mexico City, Mexico. Its European headquarters is in Amsterdam's Olympic Stadium with an additional office in Munich, Germany. The Under Armour Shanghai office is the regional headquarters for Greater China. Additional Asia Pacific offices are in Guangzhou, China; Hong Kong; Jakarta, Indonesia; Tokyo, Japan; and Sydney, Australia.

Under Armour promotes its products by sponsorship agreements with the following celebrity athletes, professional teams and college athletic teams, a field in which it competes with other sports apparel companies.

American football

Players

 Anquan Boldin (retired)
 Tom Brady (retired)
 Randall Cobb
 Vernon Davis (retired)
 Dee Ford
 Leonard Fournette
 Myles Jack
 Justin Jefferson
 Malcolm Jenkins
 Ty Johnson
 Julio Jones
 Eddie Lacy (retired)
 Marqise Lee
 Brandon Marshall (retired)
 Vance McDonald
 DK Metcalf
 Cam Newton
 Patrick Peterson
 Eric Reid
 Tony Romo (retired)
 Jonathan Taylor
 Andre Williams
 Chase Young

Leagues
XFL

Association football

Clubs

 Omiya Ardija Since 2009

 Deportivo Toluca Fútbol Club Since 2010

 Iwaki Football Club Since 2016

 Club Deportivo Universidad Católica Since 2018

  Sydney Football Club Since 2019

Players

  Jorge Valdivia
 Jermaine Jones
 Heather Mitts
 Kelley O'Hara
 Lauren Holiday
 Chloe Logarzo
 Trent Alexander-Arnold
 Tyrone Mings
 Matty Cash

Australian rules football
 Essendon Bombers

Auto racing
 Hendrick Motorsports
 Mick Schumacher

Baseball

Players

 Sandy Alcantara
 Kolby Allard
 Shaun Anderson
 Aristides Aquino
 Akil Baddoo
 José Berríos
 Alec Bohm
 Zach Britton
 J. T. Brubaker
 Dylan Bundy
 Corbin Burnes
 Lorenzo Cain
 Griffin Canning
 Dylan Carlson
 Dylan Cease
 Jhoulys Chacín
 Aaron Civale
 A. J. Cole
 William Contreras
 Sam Coonrod
 Nestor Cortes
 Lewin Díaz
 Derek Dietrich
 Brian Dozier (retired)
 Adam Duvall
 Zach Eflin
 J. P. Feyereisen
 Josh Fleming
 Wander Franco
 Freddie Freeman
 Max Fried
 Luis García
 Rony García
 Evan Gattis (retired)
 Victor Gonzalez
 Brian Goodwin
 Dee Gordon
 MacKenzie Gore
 Ronald Guzmán
 Josh Hader
 Ian Happ
 Bryce Harper
 Austin Hays
 Jonathan Hernández
 Derek Holland
 Brent Honeywell
 Sam Howard
 Jay Jackson
 Sean Kazmar Jr.
 Carter Kieboom
 Adam Kolarek
 Jake Lamb
 Eric Lauer
 Shed Long
 Brandon Lowe
 Brandon Marsh
 Nick Markakis (retired)
 Jason Martin
 Carlos Martinez
 Dustin May
 Brian McCann (retired)
 Jeff McNeil
 Mark Melancon
 Alec Mills
 Tommy Milone
 Ryan Mountcastle
 Packy Naughton
 Nick Neidert
 Brandon Nimmo
 Chris Paddack
 Enoli Paredes
 Isaac Paredes
 DJ Peters
 Cionel Perez
 Brandon Phillips (retired)
 Brett Phillips
 Adam Plutko
 Rick Porcello
 Harold Ramirez
 José Reyes (retired)
 Mark Reynolds (retired)
 Sergio Romo
 Cameron Rupp
 Sixto Sanchez
 Jesús Sánchez
 Jonathan Schoop
 Sam Selman
 Juan Soto
 Oscar Taveras (died)
 Mason Thompson
 Ryan Thompson
 Ka'ai Tom
 Josh Tomlin
 Abraham Toro
 Taylor Trammell
 Julio Urias
 Ryan Weathers
 Logan Webb
 Matt Wieters
 Mac Williamson (retired)
 Bobby Witt Jr.
 Ryan Zimmerman (retired)

Teams

  Rakuten Monkeys
 Samsung Lions
 Ripken Baseball

Basketball

Clubs 
  Partizan
  Cibona
  Seoul Samsung Thunders

College teams 
  NU Bulldogs

Men's Players

 Mohamed Bamba
 Kent Bazemore
 Stephen Curry
 Joel Embiid
 Patty Mills
 Emmanuel Mudiay
 Dennis Smith Jr.

Women's Players

 Bella Alarie
 Tyasha Harris
 Kaila Charles

Boxing

 Anthony Joshua
 Saúl "Canelo" Álvarez
 Carlos Cuadras
 Adrián Hernández
 Abner Mares
 Muhammad Ali
 Gervonta Davis

Field hockey

Golf

PGA

 Jordan Spieth
 Maverick McNealy
 Matt Fitzpatrick
 Hunter Mahan

LPGA
  Alison Lee
  Emily Kristine Pedersen

Gymnastics

Teams
 United States men's national gymnastics team
 United States women's national gymnastics team

Athletes
 Alicia Sacramone (retired)

Judo

National teams
  Gambia

Athletes
 Teddy Riner

Ice hockey
 Carey Price
 Taylor Hall
 Mitch Marner
 Drew Doughty
 Loren Gabel

Mixed martial arts and professional wrestling
 Dwayne Johnson
Teddy Riner
 Georges St-Pierre
 Mateusz Gamrot

Motorsports 

  Hailie Deegan
  Mick Schumacher

Rugby league

Players
 Jarryd Hayne

Rugby union

Associations
 Korea
 Netherlands

Clubs
 ASM Clermont Auvergne

Players
Maro Itoje
 TJ Perenara

Skateboarding
 Mitchie Brusco

Skating
 Shani Davis

Skiing
 Jeremy Bloom
 Bobby Brown
 Lindsey Vonn

Snowboarding
 Lindsey Jacobellis S
 Hailie Deegan

Surfing
 Brianna Cope
 Maddie Peterson

Swimming
 Michael Phelps
  Welson Sim

Taekwondo
 Jade Jones

Track and Field

Teams 

 Dark Sky Distance
 Mission 800 Run

Athletes 
 Georgia Ellenwood
 Natasha Hastings
 Aisha Praught-Leer
 Manteo Mitchell
 Irfan Shamsuddin

Volleyball

National teams

Players 
 Jordan Thompson
 Zhu Ting
 Yeon Koung Kim

North American colleges and universities

 NCAA Division I FBS

 Auburn Tigers
 Cincinnati Bearcats
 Coastal Carolina Chanticleers
 Colorado State Rams
 Georgia State Panthers
 Kent State Golden Flashes
 Maryland Terrapins
 Navy Midshipmen
 New Mexico State Aggies
 Northwestern Wildcats
 Notre Dame Fighting Irish
 Old Dominion Monarchs
 South Carolina Gamecocks
 Texas Tech Red Raiders and Lady Raiders
 UAB Blazers
 Utah Utes
 Wisconsin Badgers

 NCAA Division I FBS Conferences

 Conference USA
 Mid-American Conference

 NCAA Division I FCS

 Austin Peay Governors
 Campbell Fighting Camels
 Colgate Raiders
 Davidson Wildcats
 Elon Phoenix
 Fordham Rams
 Gardner-Webb Runnin' Bulldogs
 Hampton Pirates
 Houston Christian Huskies
 Howard Bison
 Indiana State Sycamores
 Jackson State Tigers
 Lamar Cardinals
 Lehigh Mountain Hawks
 LIU Sharks
 McNeese State Cowboys and Cowgirls
 Merrimack Warriors
 Monmouth Hawks
 Montana State Bobcats
 Morehead State Eagles
 Morgan State Bears
 Northern Colorado Bears
 Robert Morris Colonials
 Saint Francis Red Flash
 Sam Houston State Bearkats
 South Dakota State Jackrabbits
 Southeastern Louisiana Lions and Lady Lions
 Southeast Missouri State Redhawks
 Southern Jaguars
 Southern Illinois Salukis
 Stephen F. Austin Lumberjacks and Ladyjacks
 Tennessee State Tigers and Lady Tigers
 Texas Southern Tigers
 UT Martin Skyhawks
 Towson Tigers
 Virginia Union Panthers
 VMI Keydets
 William & Mary Tribe
 Yale Bulldogs

 NCAA Division I non-football

 American Eagles
 Belmont Bruins
 Boston University Terriers
 Bradley Braves
 Cal State Bakersfield Roadrunners
 Cal State Northridge Matadors
 Charleston Cougars
 Fairleigh Dickinson Knights
 Lipscomb Bisons
 Loyola Greyhounds
 Manhattan Jaspers
 Mount St. Mary's Mountaineers
 New Orleans Privateers
 Northeastern Huskies
 North Florida Ospreys
 Purdue Fort Wayne Mastodons
 Queens Royals
 Saint Mary's Gaels
 Seton Hall Pirates
 Siena Saints
 UC San Diego Tritons
 UMass Lowell River Hawks
 UMBC Retrievers
 UNC Wilmington Seahawks
 UT Arlington Mavericks
 Texas–Rio Grande Valley Vaqueros
 Wichita State Shockers

 NCAA Division II

 Ashland Eagles
 Auburn Montgomery Warhawks
 Black Hills State Yellow Jackets
 Bloomsburg Huskies
 Cal State East Bay Pioneers
 Cedarville Yellow Jackets
 Central College Dutch
 Clarion Golden Eagles
 Colorado Mesa Mavericks
 CSU-Pueblo ThunderWolves
 Colorado Mines Orediggers
 Dallas Baptist Patriots
 Delta State Statesmen and Lady Statesmen
 District of Columbia Firebirds
 Eastern New Mexico Greyhounds
 Elizabeth City State Vikings
 Fayetteville State Broncos and Lady Broncos
 Ferris State Bulldogs
 Flagler Saints
 Florida Southern Moccasins
 Franklin Pierce Ravens
 Frostburg State Bobcats
 Gettysburg Bullets
 Hawaii–Hilo Vulcans
 Hillsdale Chargers
 Johnson C. Smith Golden Bulls
 Lenoir-Rhyne Bears
 Lincoln Lions
 Livingstone Blue Bears
 Mansfield Mountaineer
 Mary Marauders
 Mercyhurst Lakers
 Minnesota Duluth Bulldogs
 Minot State Beavers
 Montevallo Falcons
 Muskingum Fighting Muskies
 Nebraska-Kearney Lopers
 Shaw Bears
 Shepherd Rams
 Sioux Falls Cougars
 Southeastern Oklahoma State Savage Storm
 Southern Arkansas Muleriders
 South Dakota Mines Hardrockers
 Southern New Hampshire Penmen
 Texas A&M–Commerce Lions
 Thomas Jefferson Rams
 Truman Bulldogs
 Urbana Blue Knights
 Virginia State Trojans
 Wayne State Wildcats
  West Chester Golden Rams
 Western New Mexico Mustangs
 West Texas A&M Buffaloes
 Winston-Salem State Rams

 NCAA Division II Conferences

 G-MAC
 Gulf South Conference
 Lone Star Conference
 Peach Belt Conference
 Rocky Mountain Athletic Conference

 NCAA Division III

 Adrian Bulldogs
 Agnes Scott Scotties
 Albright Lions
 Alfred State Pioneers
 Allegheny Gators
 Amherst Mammoths
 Bates Bobcats
 CUA Cardinals
 Castleton Spartans
 Cazenovia Wildcats
 Cedar Crest Falcons
 Central Dutch
 Christopher Newport Captains
 Clarkson Golden Knights
 Coe Kohawks
 Connecticut Camels
 Delaware Valley Rams
 DePauw Tigers
 Dickinson Red Devils
 Eastern Mennonite Royals
 Edgewood Eagles
 Elmhurst Blue Jays
 Elmira Eagles
 Franciscan Barons
 Gallaudet Bison
 Gettysburg Bullets
 Goucher Gophers
 Greensboro Pride
 Guilford Quakers
 Hartford Hawks
 Hilbert Eagles
 Hobart Statesmen
 Illinois Wesleyan Titans
 John Carroll Blue Streaks
 Johns Hopkins Blue Jays
 LaGrange Panthers
 Macalester Scots
 Marymount Saints
 McDaniel Green Terror
 McKendree Bearcats
 Messiah Falcons
 Misericordia Cougars
 Minnesota Morris Cougars
 Moravian Greyhounds
 Olivet Comets
 Pacific Lutheran Lutes
 Redlands Bulldogs
 Rhode Island Anchormen
 RIT Tigers
 St. Lawrence Saints
 St. Mary's Seahawks
 St. Olaf Oles
 St. Mary's Cardinals
 Salem Spirits
 Scranton Royals & Lady Royals
 Sewanee Tigers
 Springfield College Pride
 Sul Ross Lobos
 Swarthmore Garnets
 Sweet Briar Vixens
 UC Santa Cruz Banana Slugs
 UMass Dartmouth Corsairs
 UT Dallas Comets
 UW-Stevens Point Pointers
 Warren Wilson Owls
 WestConn Colonials
 Whittier Poets
 William Smith Herons
 Wisconsin–Oshkosh Titans
 Wittenberg Tigers
 WPI Engineers
 Yeshiva Maccabees

 NCAA Division III Conferences

 Atlantic East Conference

 NAIA, NCCAA, and NJCAA

 ACPHS Panthers
 Amarillo Badgers
 ACU Firestorm
 Benedictine Ravens
 Bethel Threshers
 Cardinal Stritch Wolves
 Central Methodist Eagles
 College of Idaho Coyotes
 Doane Tigers
 Embry-Riddle Prescott Eagles
 GTCC Titans
 Harris-Stowe State Hornets
 Jessup Warriors
 Keiser Seahawks
 Menlo Oaks
 Mobile Rams
 Montana Tech Orediggers
 Montana Western Bulldogs
 Providence Argonauts
 Providence Christian Sea Beggars
 Saint Xavier Cougars
 St. Thomas Bobcats
 Southern Idaho Golden Eagles
 Southern Nevada Coyotes
 The Apprentice Builders
 UAV Pioneers
 VCSU Vikings
 Westcliff Warriors

 NCAA NAIA Conferences

 Golden State Athletic Conference

 U Sports (Canada)

 Carleton Ravens
 Dalhousie Tigers
 Mount Allison Mounties
 Royal Military College Paladins
 Saskatchewan Huskies
 Toronto Varsity Blues
 Western Ontario Mustangs

Notes

Non-athlete sponsorships

 Gisele Bündchen (fashion model)
 Johan Hegg (musician)
 Dwayne Johnson (actor)
 Monica Jones (coach)
 Emma Lovewell (cycling instructor)
 A$AP Rocky (rapper)
 Virgin Galactic (spaceflight)

Olympic teams
  Team Canada (official footwear supplier)
  USA Boxing

Gallery

References

Under Armour